Çakallar can refer to the following villages in Turkey:

 Çakallar, Alanya
 Çakallar, Balya
 Çakallar, Çivril